Love Don't Live Here may refer to:

 "Love Don't Live Here" (Lady Antebellum song), a 2007 single by Lady Antebellum
 "Love Don't Live Here" (Bananarama song), a 2010 single by Bananarama
 "Love Don't Live Here", a 2008 song by Ladyhawke from Ladyhawke
 Love Don't Live Here (album), a 2016 album by Lionheart

See also 
 Love Don't Live Here Anymore (disambiguation)